James Martin  (1738–1810) was a British banker and politician who sat in the House of Commons for 31 years from 1776 to 1807.
 
Martin was the third son of John Martin MP banker, of Overbury and Lombard Street and his wife Catherine Jackson, daughter of Joseph Jackson of Sneyd Park, Gloucestershire. He was born on 4 June 1738 and was educated by Rev. Matthew Bloxam, vicar of Overbury and  Rev. James Graham, of  Hackney. On leaving school he entered the family banking house. He married Penelope Skipp, daughter  of Joseph Skipp of Upper Hall, Ledbury, Herefordshire on 17 February 1774.

Martin was elected Member of Parliament for Tewkesbury in a by-election on 8 April 1776 following the death of his brother Joseph. He "acquired a reputation for his scrupulously independent attitude".

Martin was returned unopposed for Tewkesbury in the 1780 general election. He acquired the nickname Starling Martin after condemning Fox's India bill on 1 December 1783 by saying he "wished there were a starling to perch on the Speaker's chair and repeat incessantly 'disgraceful, shameless Coalition'".

By 1790, Martin was head of the family bank in London. He was returned unopposed in  1790 but there was a contest in  1796. He was returned unopposed in  1802. He was considering retiring before the next election, but in  1806 he stood again and was returned unopposed. He retired in 1807, intending for his eldest son John to take his seat, but John was not successful in the election.

Martin died on 26 January 1810.

References

1738 births
1810 deaths
British MPs 1774–1780
British MPs 1780–1784
British MPs 1784–1790
British MPs 1790–1796
British MPs 1796–1800
UK MPs 1801–1802
UK MPs 1802–1806
UK MPs 1806–1807
Members of the Parliament of Great Britain for Tewkesbury
Members of the Parliament of the United Kingdom for Tewkesbury